Watagami may refer to:

shoulder straps of the dō-yoroi, made of leather with attached metal plates
Cotton candy